Gulf Park Estates is an unincorporated community and census-designated place (CDP) located south of Ocean Springs in Jackson County, Mississippi, United States. It is part of the Pascagoula Metropolitan Statistical Area. The population was 5,719 at the 2010 census, up from 4,272 at the 2000 census.

Geography
Gulf Park Estates is located in southwestern Jackson County at  (30.376932, -88.760579).

Demographics

2020 census

As of the 2020 United States census, there were 5,972 people, 2,145 households, and 1,607 families residing in the CDP.

2000 census
As of the census of 2000, there were 4,272 people, 1,537 households, and 1,188 families residing in the CDP. The population density was 1,610.1 people per square mile (622.4/km2). There were 1,624 housing units at an average density of 612.1/sq mi (236.6/km2). The racial makeup of the CDP was 91.90% White, 3.60% African American, 0.37% Native American, 1.54% Asian, 0.02% Pacific Islander, 0.75% from other races, and 1.80% from two or more races. Hispanic or Latino of any race were 2.29% of the population.

There were 1,537 households, out of which 44.4% had children under the age of 18 living with them, 62.6% were married couples living together, 10.5% had a female householder with no husband present, and 22.7% were non-families. 17.0% of all households were made up of individuals, and 2.7% had someone living alone who was 65 years of age or older. The average household size was 2.78 and the average family size was 3.14.

In the CDP, the population was spread out, with 30.2% under the age of 18, 8.0% from 18 to 24, 36.4% from 25 to 44, 19.7% from 45 to 64, and 5.8% who were 65 years of age or older. The median age was 34 years. For every 100 females, there were 98.6 males. For every 100 females age 18 and over, there were 97.1 males.

The median income for a household in the CDP was $47,647, and the median income for a family was $49,211. Males had a median income of $32,138 versus $26,503 for females. The per capita income for the CDP was $17,978. About 6.0% of families and 6.7% of the population were below the poverty line, including 10.0% of those under age 18 and 3.2% of those age 65 or over.

Education
Gulf Park Estates is served by the Ocean Springs School District.

Elementary schools (grades PreK-3)
 Magnolia Park Elementary School

Upper elementary schools (grades 4-6)
 Ocean Springs Upper Elementary

Middle schools (grades 7-8)
 Ocean Springs Middle School

High schools (grades 9-12)
 Ocean Springs High School

References

Census-designated places in Jackson County, Mississippi
Census-designated places in Mississippi
Pascagoula metropolitan area